
Ried may refer to:

Places

Alsace
 Ried (natural region)

Austria
Ried in der Riedmark, a market town in Upper Austria
Ried im Innkreis, a city in Upper Austria and the surrounding Bezirk Ried im Innkreis
Ried im Oberinntal, a village in Tyrol
Ried im Traunkreis, a village in Upper Austria
Ried im Zillertal, a village in Tyrol

Germany
Ried, Bavaria in Landkreis Aichach-Friedberg in Bavaria
District of the city Schrobenhausen, Bavaria 
Part of Ebersburg in the District of Fulda in Hessen
Part of Gemeinde Feldkirchen-Westerham in Landkreis Rosenheim in Bavaria
Part of the village Altmannstein in Landkreis Eichstätt
Part of the village Eriskirch on Lake Constance
Part of the village Frauenneuharting in the District of Ebersberg, Bavaria 
Part of the village Kochel am See in the District of Bad Tölz-Wolfratshausen in Bavaria
Part of the village Obermaiselstein in the District of Oberallgäu in Bavaria
Part of the village Pfronten in Bavaria
Riedstadt, Hesse, near Frankfurt am Main and Darmstadt

Netherlands
Ried, Friesland, in Franekeradeel in Friesland

Switzerland
Ried bei Kerzers, in Canton Fribourg (1902-1911: Ried; before 1902: Oberried (Sea))
Ried-Blatten, in Canton Valais
Ried-Brig, in Canton Valais
Ried-Mörel, Östlich Raron, Canton Valais
Riederalp, in Canton Valais
Essert FR, Sarine District, Canton Fribourg
Ried-Muotathal, in Canton Schwyz

Other uses
 SV Ried, an Austrian football club

See also
 Reid (disambiguation)
Reidy